Wilhelmus "Wim" Maria van Heumen (28 October 1928 – 31 January 1992) was a field hockey coach from the Netherlands, who was in charge of the Dutch National Men's Team from 1975 to 1986.

Career
Van Heumen graduated in 1954 with a degree in physical education. Beginning in 1956 he taught this subject at the Academy of Physical Education in Tilburg. In 1966 he became a coach with the field hockey club of 's-Hertogenbosch and later a national coach with a first match played on 19 July 1975. He retired from this position in April 1986 after supervising 232 matches with 139 wins and 35 draws.

Van Heumen introduced new elements to Dutch hockey such as playing on artificial grass and combining summer training on grass with winter plays indoors.

Politics 
A member of the Catholic People's Party (KVP) and its successor the Christian Democratic Appeal (CDA) Van Heumen was a member of the municipal council of 's-Hertogenbosch from 1970 till his death in 1992. From 1990 he was also an alderman.

Family
Van Heumen was born to Hendrikus Johannes van Heumen and Petronella Henkelman. On 9 February he married Martina Gijsberdina Theresia Vollebergh (born 1926). They had four sons and one daughter. One son, Gijs van Heumen (born 1952), became a prominent field hockey coach with the women's team in the 1980s.

References

1928 births
1992 deaths
Aldermen in North Brabant
People from 's-Hertogenbosch
Catholic People's Party politicians
20th-century Dutch politicians
Christian Democratic Appeal politicians
Dutch field hockey coaches
Municipal councillors of 's-Hertogenbosch
Sportspeople from Nijmegen